Rajko Toroman (born February 10, 1955) is a Serbian professional basketball coach.

Coaching career 
Before 2016, he served as a team consultant for the Barako Bull Energy Cola and the Petron Blaze Boosters in the Philippine Basketball Association. He previously coached the Philippines men's national basketball team having been hired by country's basketball federation Samahang Basketbol ng Pilipinas. Toroman led the Philippines into 4th place in the 2011 FIBA Asia Championship. From 2014 to 2016, he served as the head coach of the Jordanian national basketball team.

Before working in the Philippines, he worked with the Iranian Basketball Team which brought the country to the 2008 Beijing Olympic Games.

He is slated to represent the Philippines in the upcoming 2019 William Jones Cup as the lead assistant coach for Mighty Sports.

Personal life
Toroman is married, has one daughter, who was married to basketball player Mladen Šekularac. Toroman's nephew Denis plays professional basketball for KK Luka Koper in the Premier A Slovenian Basketball League.

References

External links 

 Video interview with Rajko Toroman @ fiba.com

1955 births
Living people
Pagrati B.C. coaches
BKK Radnički coaches
Serbian men's basketball coaches
KK Vojvodina coaches
KK Sloga coaches
KK Spartak Subotica coaches
KK IMT Beograd coaches
Philippines men's national basketball team coaches
Serbian expatriate basketball people in Bahrain
Serbian expatriate basketball people in Iran
Serbian expatriate basketball people in Belgium
Serbian expatriate basketball people in Greece
Serbian expatriate basketball people in China
Serbian expatriate basketball people in Jordan
Serbian expatriate basketball people in Hungary
Serbian expatriate basketball people in Cyprus
Serbian expatriate basketball people in Indonesia
Serbian expatriate basketball people in Poland
Serbian expatriate basketball people in the Netherlands
Serbian expatriate basketball people in the Philippines
San Miguel Beermen coaches
Barako Bull Energy coaches